The explicit (from Latin explicitus est, "it is unrolled", as applied to scrolls) of a text or document is either a final note indicating the end of the text and often including information about its place, date and authorship or else the final few words of the text itself. In the first case, it is similar to a colophon but always appearing at the end of the text. In the second case, it corresponds to the incipit, the first few words of a text.

References

Latin literary phrases